The 10th Coast Artillery Regiment was  a Coast Artillery regiment in the United States Army. It primarily served as the Regular Army coast artillery component of the Harbor Defenses (HD) of Narragansett Bay, Rhode Island from 1924 through 1944, when it was relieved and disbanded as part of an Army-wide reorganization.

Lineage
Constituted in the Regular Army 27 February 1924 as 10th Coast Artillery (Harbor Defense), and organized 1 July 1924 at Fort Adams by redesignating the following companies of the Coast Artillery Corps (CAC): 173rd, 52nd, 97th, 102nd, 110th, 129th, 147th, and 174th. (and 7th CA Band). Only Headquarters and Headquarters Battery (HHB) activated; provided caretaker detachments for HD Narragansett Bay and HD New Bedford. The 243rd Coast Artillery was the Rhode Island National Guard component of HD Narragansett Bay.
 1st, 2nd, and 3rd Battalion and HHB constituted as inactive components on 31 January 1935.
 Batteries A and B activated at Fort Wetherill on 1 July 1939 and 1 September 1940.
 HHB provided caretaker detachment at Fort Rodman, HD New Bedford, Massachusetts until activation of 23rd Coast Artillery Battalion on 1 February 1940.
 Batteries C, D, E, and F activated 10 February 1941 at Fort Adams. Battery C assigned to Fort Greene.  Batteries D, E, and F assigned to Fort Church, RI.
 1st and 2nd Battalions and HHB activated on 25 April 1941.
 Battery G activated 6 January 1941 at Fort Adams, as searchlight (SL) battery.
 Battery E transferred to HD Portland (less personnel and equipment) and redesignated Battery L, 8th Coast Artillery on 26 July 1943.
 The 10th CA manned defenses in the eastern part of HD Narragansett Bay and all mine defenses in the bay.
 Regimental assets transferred to HD Narragansett Bay and HHB 10th Coast Artillery reassigned to Camp Forrest, TN 14 March 1944; inactivated 10 April 1944. 
 Disbanded 31 May 1944.

Unit lineage resumed as follows:
 HHB reconstituted in the Regular Army 28 June 1950 as HHB, 10th Antiaircraft Artillery Group.
 HHB redesignated as HHB, 10th Artillery Group 20 March 1958 (see 10th Army Air & Missile Defense Command for further lineage).

Distinctive unit insignia
 Description
A Gold color and metal enamel device 1 inch (2.54 cm) in height overall blazoned:  On a wreath Or and Gules, a triton torque drawing a bow and arrow aimed bendwise Or, above a sea wave Vert (Transparent Sea Green) in front of a Latin cross couped Azure.                    
 Symbolism
The blue cross indicates the Civil War service of Battery E, 5th Artillery (now Battery E, 10th Coast Artillery).  It served in the 3rd Division, 6th Army Corps during this conflict.  The triton with bow and arrow symbolizes danger rising from the sea, against which the Coast Artillery in its forts must guard.                        
 Background
The distinctive unit insignia was originally approved for the 10th Coast Artillery Regiment on 27 February 1926.  It was redesignated for the 10th Antiaircraft Artillery Automatic Weapons Battalion on 13 June 1952.

(note- according to Sawicki the Automatic Weapons battalion was converted to a Missile Battalion on 5 December 1956 (Nike), and inactivated 1 September 1958 at Fairchild Air Force Base, Spokane, Washington.)

Coat of arms

Blazon
 Shield
Gules, four cannons saltirewise base to base Or above an anchor paleways Azure fimbriated Argent; augmented of a canton per bend sinister, paly of fifteen of the field and of the fourth, base of the second.              
 Crest
On a wreath Or and Gules, a triton torque drawing a bow and arrow aimed bendwise Or, above a sea wave Vert (Transparent Sea Green) in front of a Latin cross couped Azure. Motto VAILLANT ET VEILLANT (Valiant and Vigilant).

Symbolism
 Shield
The red of the shield signifies Artillery; the blue anchor is taken from the coat of arms of the old Coast Defenses of Narragansett Bay; the four cannons form the Roman numeral ten.  Battery D, 10th Coast Artillery claims parentage from Battery C, 2nd Coast Artillery (formerly 14th Company, Coast Artillery Corps and Battery C, 2nd Artillery). As the 14th Company, CAC, this company was in the Coast Defenses of Narragansett Bay from 1907 through 1924.  The latter has no coat of arms but the addition of a canton is made to indicate this parentage, but divided since one battery can claim this parentage. Battery C, 2nd Coast Artillery was part of the garrison of Fort McHenry and commanded by Captain Frederic Evans during its bombardment, 13 September 1814, and this event is taken from the coat of arms of the 2nd Coast Artillery and depicted in the fifteen stripes in the canton.            
 Crest
The blue cross indicates the Civil War service of Battery E, 5th Artillery (now Battery E, 10th Coast Artillery).  It served in the 3rd Division, 6th Army Corps during this conflict.  The triton with bow and arrow symbolizes danger rising from the sea, against which the Coast Artillery in its forts must guard.

Background
The coat of arms was originally approved for the 10th Coast Artillery on 27 February 1926.  It was redesignated for the 10th Antiaircraft Artillery Automatic Weapons Battalion on 13 June 1952.

Campaign streamers
none

Decorations
none

See also
 Distinctive unit insignia (U.S. Army)
 Seacoast defense in the United States
 United States Army Coast Artillery Corps
 Harbor Defense Command

References

 
 Gaines, William C., Coast Artillery Organizational History, 1917-1950, Coast Defense Journal, vol. 23, issue 2 (Regular Army regiments)
 Gaines, William C., Historical Sketches Coast Artillery Regiments 1917-1950, National Guard Army Regiments 197-265
 Coast Artillery Journal, August 1923, page 123
 Coast Artillery Journal, January 1927, page 73 
 
 (dead link 12 September 2017)

External links

 Official US Army lineage website for current units 

010
Military units and formations in Rhode Island
History of Rhode Island
Military units and formations established in 1924
Military units and formations disestablished in 1944